Reborn in the USA is a British reality television show broadcast on ITV, in which ten British pop acts were transported to the US, where they were supposedly not known in the hope of revitalising their music career.

Each week, the American audience voted for their favourite act. The two acts with the fewest votes would then face the vote from the British public, where the following week the act with the fewest votes was eliminated from the contest and sent back to Britain. The series was presented by Davina McCall and the eventual winner was ex Spandau Ballet lead singer Tony Hadley, who was awarded with the prize of a recording contract.

Overview 
The competitors were: Tony Hadley, Michelle Gayle, Gina G, Elkie Brooks, Dollar, Leee John (of Imagination), Haydon Eshun (of Ultimate Kaos), Sonia and Mark Shaw of Then Jerico. Controversy hit the show early on when Shaw quit the show in the first week after being criticised by other participants for his drunken behaviour prior to the recording of the first concert. Quickly, Peter Cox (of Go West) was flown in as a replacement.

Contrary to the rules, Hadley, Cox, and Gina G all had at least 1 Top 40 hit (and in the case of Dollar had their only US single, "Shooting Star," peaked at No. 74 in 1978) on the Billboard Hot 100 singles in the US, while Sonia's debut single peaked at number 10 on Billboard's Dance/Club Play Songs chart in 1990; Gina G, Cox (as part of Go West), and John's group also placed singles on the latter.

Further controversy arose in the second week when acts Dollar and Sonia had received the fewest votes and were both up for the public vote. Sonia elected to leave the tour due to stress, but then decided to return to face the vote. Dollar (David Van Day and Thereza Bazar) accused her of pulling a publicity stunt to gain votes, resulting in a heated argument between the two acts, where Sonia ultimately told Van Day he was "a nasty piece of work". In the end, Dollar were voted off and Sonia continued in the show for a few more weeks.

The format for the show had the artists travelling on a tour bus to a new venue each week. Each would perform one song which would relate to the city they were performing in (e.g. the concert in New Orleans would have each perform a well-known song about New Orleans). All songs performed were cover versions, until the final show where the final two (Hadley and Gayle) each sang one of their own hits. Despite his late entry to the show, Peter Cox was the favourite to win, but he finished in third place after forgetting the words to the song he was performing.

The show's theme music was composed and produced by Stuart Hancock for London-based music production company Mcasso Music, and variations of this theme music were used to accompany the on-screen action between song performances.

Following the show's transmission, a book and an album was released. The album contained studio recordings of various cover versions by the acts, comprising 17 songs.

Results 
Winner: Tony Hadley
2nd: Michelle Gayle
3rd: Peter Cox from Go West
4th: Haydon Eshun from Ultimate Kaos
5th: Leee John (from Imagination)
6th: Sonia
7th: Elkie Brooks
8th: Gina G
9th: Dollar (David Van Day and Thereza Bazar)
10th: Mark Shaw (quit after one day)

Album 
Reborn in the USA – 17 Unforgettable Songs as Performed on the hit ITV1 Show

  Tony Hadley – "Walking in Memphis"
  Peter Cox – "Me and Mrs Jones"
 Haydon Eshun – "Misty Blue"
 Michelle Gayle – "Until You Come Back to Me"
 Elkie Brooks – "Love Letters"
 Leee John – "Betcha By Golly Wow"
 Gina G – "I Can't Make You Love Me"
 Sonia – "Evergreen"
 Haydon Eshun – "Wonderful Tonight"
 Tony Hadley – "To Love Somebody"
 Elkie Brooks – "The Rose"
 Peter Cox – "Nick of Time"
 Michelle Gayle – "Love Me Tender"
 Leee John – "A Little Bit More"
 Gina G – "Don't Leave Me This Way"
 Dollar – "Somethin' Stupid"
 Tony Hadley – "I Can't Make You Love Me"

References

External links 
 

2003 British television series debuts
2003 British television series endings
ITV reality television shows
Television series based on singers and musicians